Julia Cornelia Slaughter ( Widgery; 1850–1905) was an American artist and community leader. She started her career as a painter in England, creating portraits and landscapes in oil, watercolor, and pastel. Later, she focused on still-lifes and landscapes. In about 1876, she moved to New York and exhibited in major city exhibitions, including the National Academy of Design, American Art Association, and Society of American Artists. Slaughter spent some time in San Francisco and arrived in Tacoma in 1891, where in later years she was highly esteemed in social and art circles.

Slaughter co-founded and was twice elected president of the Tacoma Art League, which later developed into the Tacoma Art Museum. She was the founder and president of the Washington State Cooperation Society; a member of the Ferry Museum Board of Trustees (and the only female member of that time); the first female member of the American Art Union; and the second vice president of the Woman's Exchange organization in Tacoma.

Slaughter was one of the Washingtonian commissioners for the World's Fair of 1893. As superintendent of the Department of Fine Art, she collected a vast array of art pieces from around the state for the Fair exhibition. She is credited for creating art leagues in Seattle, Spokane, Walla Walla, Olympia, Fairhaven and Whatcom (later Bellingham). She was also president of the Lady Commissioners during the Atlanta Cotton States exposition in 1895.

Early life and family

Slaughter was born in 1850 in Exeter, Devonshire, England. She was the daughter of landscape painter William Widgery, and one of her relatives on father's side was the well-known English painter Joseph Mallord William Turner, whose work was exhibited in the National Gallery and considered "the pride of English nation." Slaughter's brother, Frederick John Widgery, studied in European art schools of Europe and became a painter-landscaper.

Education and first exhibitions

Slaughter started studying art in English schools at 14 years old. She worked with oil, watercolor and pastel, and painted both portraits and landscapes. In 1872, she exhibited her first works at the Society of British Artists exhibition on Suffolk Street in London.

Career

New York City

Approximately in 1876, Slaughter settled in New York and lived there until 1888. She worked as a realist painter, creating still-life paintings and landscapes. During her life in New York, she exhibited her artwork in the "major Annual Exhibitions" of the city, including the National Academy of Design, American Art Association, and Society of American Artists.

Tacoma, Washington

Slaughter moved to Tacoma in 1891, and later became highly esteemed in social circles of the city. She was known as a "prominent Tacoma artist," and was an active member in the city's in musical, literary, artistic and philanthropical societies.

In late 1880s, Slaughter founded an art league in Tacoma, but it closed after its first exhibition. Later, she co-organized the Tacoma Art League to promote art among Tacoma citizens. It was officially formed on October 28, 1908, and later developed into the Tacoma Art Museum. It held annual exhibitions in the city and was estimated as a "very successful organization" of that period. Over the years, Slaughter was elected president of the league two times, as well as chairing the committees and serving as treasurer. She also became a charter member of the literary club Aloha, founded by league members in 1892.

World's Fair Exposition of 1893

In 1893, the Chicago World's Fair (also named World's Columbian Exposition), was held to celebrate the 400th anniversary of Christopher Columbus' arrival in the New World in 1492. In 1891, the Washington State Legislature created a World's Fair Commission to organize Washington state exhibits for the Chicago Fair. Appointed superintendent of the Department of Fine Art in 1891, Slaughter spent several years working for the commission. Her duties were to visit various art centers and organize art leagues across the state. She attracted state artists' attention to Washington state scenery, influenced them to make art pieces depicting it, and collected pieces for the World's Fair exhibition.

In the course of this work, Slaughter organized art leagues in different state cities, including Seattle, Spokane, Walla Walla, Olympia, Fairhaven, and Whatcom (later Bellingham).

Other activity and memberships

In 1895, Slaughter was elected president of  Lady Commissioners, an organization created to work at the Atlanta Cotton States exposition.

She was the founder and president of the Washington State Cooperation Society, which was created to support and popularize Washingtonian home industries. In 1903, Slaughter was on the Board of Trustees of the Ferry Museum, which was considered "Tacoma's most notable public institution." At the time, she was the only female member of the board.

Slaughter was a member of the American Art Union and its first female member. She was the second vice president of the Tacoma Woman's Exchange organization.

Personal life and death

For a period of time, Julia Widgery was known under the name of Julia Grisworld, and under that name exhibited paintings in New York in 1876–1888. American art historian Peter H. Falk concluded that she was briefly married at the time. In 1889, she went to San Francisco and married Samuel C. Slaughter, a pioneer real estate businessman and politician of Tacoma.

Slaughter was diagnosed with cancer in 1905. That year, she went to West Cardiff, Wales, where she later died.

See also 

 Frederick John Widgery
 Samuel C. Slaughter
 Tacoma Art Museum
 World's Columbian Exposition
 Cotton States and International Exposition
 Society of American Artists
 Royal Society of British Artists

References

Literature cited

External links 

 Julia Slaughter's Biography
 

English women painters
English landscape painters
English portrait painters
Painters from Washington (state)
American women painters
Artists from New York City
Artists from Tacoma, Washington
American realist painters
World's Columbian Exposition
Woman's Exchange movement
1850 births
1905 deaths